Serota may refer to:

 Beatrice Serota, Baroness Serota (née Katz; 1919–2002), British Government minister and a Deputy Speaker of the House of Lords, mother of Nicholas Serota
 Nicholas Serota (born 1946), director of the Tate art museums and galleries
 Serota, a town possibly held by the Celtic tribe Serretes

See also
 Sir Nicholas Serota Makes an Acquisitions Decision, a painting of the Stuckism art movement
 "Serota tendency", a term coined by Brian Sewell
Sirota, a surname